Mohammad Abbas (born 10 March 1990) is a Pakistani international cricketer who plays for Pakistan national cricket team and for Southern Punjab domestically.

In August 2018, he was one of thirty-three players to be awarded a central contract for the 2018–19 season by the Pakistan Cricket Board (PCB). The International Cricket Council (ICC) named Abbas as one of the five breakout stars in men's cricket in 2018. In July 2021, Abbas lost his central contract after failing to maintain his place in the national team.

Early life
Abbas was born in a small village Jathekey near Sambrial. Before his first-class debut, he earned his livelihood through welding work in a leather factory and working as a helper in a law firm in Sialkot.

Domestic career
Abbas took the most wickets in the 2015–16 Quaid-e-Azam Trophy, with a total of 61 dismissals for the tournament. In the following tournament he was also the leading wicket-taker, with 71 dismissals.

Abbas was the leading wicket-taker for Sui Northern Gas Pipelines Limited in the 2017–18 Quaid-e-Azam Trophy, with 37 dismissals in seven matches.

On 4 March 2021, Abbas signed for Hampshire County Cricket Club as one of their overseas players for the first two months of the 2021 County Championship season in England. In April 2021, in Hampshire's match against Middlesex, Abbas took a hat-trick during Middlesex's first innings. In January 2022, Abbas re-signed with Hampshire ahead of the 2022 County Championship.

International career
In April 2017, Abbas was added to Pakistan's Test squad for their series against the West Indies. He made his Test debut for Pakistan against the West Indies on 21 April 2017 at Sabina Park. He took his maiden Test wicket with his second ball, dismissing Kraigg Brathwaite for nought and finished the match with three wickets. Abbas took his maiden five-wicket haul, against West Indies, in his third Test match.

Abbas took ten wickets in Pakistan's two-Test series against England in May and June 2018, and was named the player of the series. In August 2018, he was named the PCB's Test Player of the Year.

In October 2018, in the series against Australia, Abbas took his 50th wicket in his tenth Test match. With that, he became the joint-quickest fast bowler, in terms of matches played, to take 50 wickets for Pakistan in Tests. In the last test of that series, he took his first ten-wicket haul in international cricket with five wickets in each innings. Abbas was the first pace bowler to achieve this in the United Arab Emirates.

In March 2019, Abbas was named in Pakistan's One Day International (ODI) squad for their series against Australia. He made his ODI debut for Pakistan against Australia on 22 March 2019. In November 2019, he was selected again for the tour of Australia. He played in the second Test, but he did not take a wicket.

In June 2020, Abbas was named in a 29-man squad for Pakistan's tour to England during the COVID-19 pandemic. In July, he was shortlisted in Pakistan's 20-man squad for the Test matches against England. In November 2020, he was named in Pakistan's 35-man squad for their tour to New Zealand.

References

External links
 

1990 births
Living people
Pakistani cricketers
Pakistan Test cricketers
Pakistan One Day International cricketers
Federal Areas cricketers
Khan Research Laboratories cricketers
Cricketers from Sialkot
Pakistan Television cricketers
Sialkot cricketers
Sialkot Stallions cricketers
Multan Sultans cricketers
Sui Northern Gas Pipelines Limited cricketers
Leicestershire cricketers
Southern Punjab (Pakistan) cricketers
Welders
Hampshire cricketers
Islamabad cricketers
Rawalpindi cricketers